Ferguson River may refer to:

 Ferguson River (Nunavut), Canada
 Ferguson River (Western Australia)

See also 
 Ferguson (disambiguation)